Charles Stackhouse (born April 4, 1980) is a former professional American football player who played fullback for two seasons for the New York Giants and the Minnesota Vikings.

1980 births
Living people
People from West Memphis, Arkansas
Players of American football from Arkansas
American football fullbacks
Ole Miss Rebels football players
New York Giants players
Minnesota Vikings players